Happy in the Hollow is the fourth studio album by English band Toy. It was released on 25 January 2019 through Tough Love Records.

Track listing

Charts

References

2019 albums
Toy (English band) albums